Malá Ida is a village and municipality in Košice-okolie District in the Kosice Region of eastern Slovakia.

History
In historical records the village was first mentioned in 1280.

Geography
The village lies at an altitude of 306 metres and covers an area of 10.194 km².
It has a population of about 1175 people.

Culture
The village has a public library and a sports gymnasium.

External links

Villages and municipalities in Košice-okolie District